Trichomycterus trefauti is a species of pencil catfish presently only known from the upper basin of the São Francisco River in Minas Gerais state, Brazil.

This is a small, cylindrical catfish (35–55 mm standard length) which can most readily be distinguished from its congeners by its uniformly grey colouring, marked only by a distinctive elliptical dark spot at the base of the caudal fin. Other notable features include widely spaced eyes, very long barbels, the extension of the first ray of the pectoral fin into a long filament and pelvic fins which completely cover the anus and urogenital openings.

References
 
 

trefauti
Fish of the São Francisco River basin
Fish described in 2004